Ip Ching (born Ip Hok-ching; 7 July 1936 – 25 January 2020) was a Hong Kong martial artist. He was one of five Grandmasters of the Ip Man (Yip Man) family of Wing Chun Kung Fu.

Biography 

He was born Ip Hok-ching in Foshan in 1936 as the second son of Ip Man and his wife Cheung Wing-sing. This was short-lived as his parents and his sister Ip Nga-sum had to leave and travel to Hong Kong in about 1950 in search of a better life for the family, and only his mother and sister returned home later on.

In 1962, due to the Cultural Revolution, Ip Ching and his older brother Ip Chun were forced to leave Foshan and moved to Hong Kong to join their father.

His father Ip Man taught from his home. At one point his father walked out of his home to live elsewhere due to a dispute with him and Ip Chun over his Shanghai mistress and his illegitimate son Ip Siu-wah. His father barely interacted with him and his brother since then, except for their training lessons.

As well as learning Wing Chun at his father's home, Ip Ching also was an avid observer of his father teaching other students, in turn gaining valuable insight on his father's teaching methods.

After Ip Man's death in 1972, Ip Ching left the training hall but continued to reside in his father's home. He later ran a manufacturing business in Lam Tei, New Territories, and continued to teach Wing Chun privately to his disciples in his home.

In 1994, he retired and devoted himself to teaching Wing Chun full-time.

He served as a Wing Chun consultant alongside his brother Chun on the film Ip Man 3. Jim Liu portrayed the character of Ip Ching in the film.

He died on 25 January 2020.

References

External links
 
 Ip Ching (Grand Master) , profile at the Int'l Wing Chun Combat & Eastern Arts Council site
 

1936 births
2020 deaths
Sportspeople from Guangdong
People from Nanhai District
Wing Chun practitioners from Hong Kong
People from Foshan
Cantonese people
Chinese Wing Chun practitioners